Peng Jianhua (born 18 December 1996) is a Chinese long-distance runner. He qualified to represent China at the 2020 Summer Olympics in Tokyo 2021, competing in men's marathon.

References

External links
 

 

1996 births
Living people
Chinese male long-distance runners
Athletes (track and field) at the 2020 Summer Olympics
Olympic athletes of China
Chinese male marathon runners
20th-century Chinese people
21st-century Chinese people